Lakeside Village is an outlet shopping centre in Lakeside, a suburb of Doncaster, South Yorkshire, England. Remodelled in 2003, it was previously known as The Yorkshire Outlet.

Lakeside Village is owned by Hermes and operated by the retail property asset management company Realm, which also work together on a number of other outlet centres in the UK.

Stores

Flagship
Clarks
Marks & Spencer
Next

Smaller stores
Cadbury
Lillywhites
Pavers

Transport

Bus
Bus services 56 from stand A4 direct from the Frenchgate Interchange. Bus service 55 goes from the outlet direct to the Frenchgate Interchange. Journey time averages around 10 minutes each way.

Rail
Doncaster station is a major UK railway station and is served by Northern, London North Eastern Railway, TransPennine Express, East Midlands Railway and Hull Trains. Doncaster is 1 hour 35 minutes from London Kings Cross or 20 minutes from Sheffield station (using direct services). The station is adjacent to Doncaster Frenchgate Interchange, from which all bus services depart.

External links
Lakeside Village website
Realm Retail Property Asset Management website

Buildings and structures in Doncaster
Shopping centres in South Yorkshire